The Wayne Gretzky Trophy is awarded annually to the champion of the Western conference playoffs in the Ontario Hockey League. It was first awarded in 1999. The winning team competes for the J. Ross Robertson Cup in the OHL finals versus the Bobby Orr Trophy winner.

It is named in honour of Wayne Gretzky. He played for the Sault Ste. Marie Greyhounds in the 1977–78 OHL season, scoring 70 goals as a rookie, establishing an OHL record for most goals by a 16-year-old that stood until 2007. Gretzky also had 112 assists, and 182 points that season, the second highest point total in an OHL season. Gretzky was awarded the Emms Family Award as the rookie of the year, and the William Hanley Trophy as most gentlemanly player.

Winners
List of winners of the Wayne Gretzky Trophy.

See also
 List of Canadian Hockey League awards

References

External links
 Ontario Hockey League

Ontario Hockey League trophies and awards
Trophy
Awards established in 1999
1999 establishments in Ontario